The Lady of the Lake is the name of several related characters in the Arthurian legend.

Lady of the Lake can also refer to:

Literature
The Speeches at Prince Henry's Barriers or The Lady of the Lake, a masque or entertainment written by Ben Jonson
The Lady of the Lake (poem), a poem by Sir Walter Scott
 The Lady of the Lake, a dramatic version of Scott's poem, by Edmund John Eyre.
Lady of the Lake (Sapkowski novel), a novel by Polish fantasy writer Andrzej Sapkowski
"Lady of the lake", an epithet for Artemis Isoria by Pausanias

Music
Fräulein vom See, by Franz Schubert, a Lieder cycle which contains Schubert's Ave Maria
La donna del lago, an opera by Gioachino Rossini, based on Scott's poem
"Lady of the Lake", a song by Carole King and Toni Stern on the 1968  Strawberry Alarm Clock album The World in a Sea Shell
"Lady of the Lake", a song by Jade Warrior from the album Last Autumn's Dream
"Lady of the Lake", a song by Rainbow from the album Long Live Rock 'n' Roll
Lady of the Lake, an opera by Elie Siegmeister
"Lady of the Lake", a song by Starcastle from the album Starcastle
"Lady of the Lake", a song by Rick Wakeman from the album The Myths and Legends of King Arthur and the Knights of the Round Table

Film and TV
The Lady of the Lake (film), a 1928 British film
"The Lady of the Lake" (Merlin), an episode of the BBC TV series Merlin
"Lady of the Lake" (Jewel Riders), an episode of the animated television series Princess Gwenevere and the Jewel Riders
 Lady of the Lake, a 1998 film directed by Maurice Devereaux
"Lady of the Lake" (Once Upon a Time), a 2012 ABC fairy tale drama Once Upon a Time episode

Transport

Locomotives
LNWR Lady of the Lake class, a British type of express passenger locomotive, of which 60 were built by the LNWR between 1859 and 1865

Ships
 Lady of the Lake, a steamboat built on Anderson Lake, British Columbia, Canada in 1860
 Lady of the Lake, a ferry on Lake Chelan to the community of Stehekin, Washington

 , an Aberdeen-built brig which sank in 1833
 , a paddle steamboat built in 1836 for use on the Strangford Ferry in Northern Ireland
 , a screw steamboat built in 1897 at Seattle, Washington, later rebuilt and renamed Ruth
 , an excursion vessel built in 1877 and still operating on Ullswater in the English Lake District
 , a vessel built in 1845 for service on Lake Windermere in the English Lake District; see Windermere Lake Cruises
 , a vessel built in 1859 for service on Coniston Water in the English Lake District; Furness Railway
 , a vessel built in 1908 to replace the 1859 vessel on Coniston Water in the English Lake District; Furness Railway
 , a United States Navy schooner that participated in the War of 1812

See also
Lady in the Lake (disambiguation)
Lady in the Water, a 2006 film by M. Night Shyamalan